Cofton Reservoir is a canal feeder reservoir, south of the village of Cofton Hackett, Worcestershire in the United Kingdom. It is the highest of four Worcester and Birmingham Canal reservoirs in the upper catchments of the River Arrow. It was originally built in 1815 as a compensation reservoir for watermills, which would have otherwise been affected by the construction of the canal. It was later used as a water supply for the canal, a function for which it still serves.

See also

Canals of the United Kingdom
History of the British canal system

External links
 Cofton Lake Conservation Ltd

Canal reservoirs in England
Reservoirs in Worcestershire
Birmingham Canal Navigations